Bishnu Prasad Prasain is a Former Governor of Bagmati Province. He was Appointed as the Governor, as per the Article 163 (2) of the Constitution of Nepal, by the President Bidya Devi Bhandari on the recommendation of the Council of Ministers of the Government of Nepal on 4 November 2019.
In 2051 BS, he was the Executive Chairman of the Nepal Tea Development Board and in 2054 BS, He served as the Deputy Chairman of the District Development Committee of Jhapa District. In 2056 BS. He was a CPN UML Candidate for House of Representatives from Jhapa 3 (constituency) but he lost the election and In 2017 Nepalese local elections. He was again CPN UMLCandidate for the post of Mayor of Mechinagar Municipality but lost the election.

See also
 Bagmati Province
 Governor (Nepal)

References

Communist Party of Nepal (Unified Marxist–Leninist) politicians
People from Jhapa District
Living people
Nepal Communist Party (NCP) politicians
Governors of Bagmati Province
Year of birth missing (living people)